Kheyrabad (also Romanized as Kheyrābād) is a village in Seyfabad Rural District, in the Central District of Khonj County, Fars Province, Iran. At the 2006 census, its population was 48, in 9 families.

References 

Populated places in Khonj County